JSC Vyatskiye Polyany Molot Machine-Building Plant is a Russian company based in Vyatskiye Polyany. The plant  manufactures rifles and shotguns under the Molot-Oruzhiye (Hammer Weapon) and VEPR ( Wild Boar) brands, and is a subsidiary of Rostec. It is one of the largest companies in Kirov Oblast.

Molot was established in 1940, and was originally based in Zagorsk, Moscow Oblast. It was the main manufacturer of the PPSh-41 submachine gun. In 1941 the plant was evacuated to Vyatskiye Polyany with its workers, including G. S. Shpagin and N. F. Makarov, designer of the eponymous Makarov pistol. In the 1950s the plant manufactured the Vyatka motor scooter.

In the 1990s the company diversified by launching a line of sports and hunting weapons. Rifles manufactured in the Molot plant are exported to the United States under the VEPR brand. 

The company entered bankruptcy proceedings in 2012; as of 2017 it is being controlled by a bankruptcy managing company.

References

External links
 Official website

Companies based in Kirov Oblast
Rostec
Firearm manufacturers of Russia
Manufacturing companies established in 1940
1940 establishments in the Soviet Union
Motorcycle manufacturers of the Soviet Union
Defence companies of the Soviet Union
Russian entities subject to the U.S. Department of the Treasury sanctions